Grayland Arnold Jr. (born September 4, 1997) is an American football strong safety for the Houston Texans of the National Football League (NFL). He played college football at Baylor.

Early life and high school
Arnold attended Kountze High School. On the basketball court, he was a two-time All-State selection, District 23-3A Most Valuable Player and named of the top 15 basketball players in Texas. During his freshman year, former NFL player Frank Middleton, who was an assistant coach, convinced him to join the football team. Arnold ended up becoming an All-State selection at cornerback, in addition to earning District Offensive MVP honors as a quarterback and wide receiver. He was a three-star prospect and committed to Baylor.

College career
Arnold had nine tackles in a win against Boise State in the 2016 Cactus Bowl. As a freshman at Baylor in 2016, Arnold started four of 11 games and tallied 20 tackles and four pass breakups. His sophomore season was hampered due to a broken arm which forced him to miss several games. He finished the season with 35 tackles, seven pass break ups and an interception. As a junior in 2018, Arnold also suffered an ankle injury which ended the season after four games, forcing him to redshirt. He was named Big 12 Special Teams player of the week in week two of the 2019 season. In 2019, Arnold ranked second in the Big 12 with six interceptions, and also recorded 46 total tackles, 2.5 tackles for a loss and two pass breakups. He also averaged 12.4 yards on punt returns with one touchdown. Arnold was named to the Second-team All-Big 12. Following the season, he announced he was forgoing his redshirt senior season and entering the NFL draft. In his career, Arnold had 107 total tackles, 7.5 tackles for a loss and seven interceptions. He was invited to the NFL Scouting Combine.

Professional career

Philadelphia Eagles
in the 2020 NFL Draft, Arnold signed an 3 year deal with the Philadelphia Eagles on April 26, 2020. He was named the Eagles' best undrafted free agent by CBS Sports, with scouts praising his versatility. He was waived on September 3, 2020, and re-signed to the team's practice squad three days later. Arnold was elevated to the active roster on September 26 for the team's week 3 game against the Cincinnati Bengals. He made his debut in the game, playing 12 snaps on special teams, and reverted to the practice squad after the game.  He was elevated again on October 3 for the week 4 game against the San Francisco 49ers, and reverted to the practice squad again following the game. Arnold was promoted to the active roster on October 10, 2020. He was waived on October 13 and re-signed to the practice squad two days later. He was promoted to the active roster on December 1, 2020.

On August 31, 2021, Arnold was waived by the Eagles and re-signed to the practice squad the next day. He was released on September 3.

Houston Texans
On September 15, 2021, Arnold was signed to the Houston Texans practice squad. On December 11, Arnold was elevated to the active roster from the practice squad and made his debut against the Seattle Seahawks. He was signed to the active roster on December 23. On December 29, Arnold signed a contract extension with the Texans that runs through the 2022 season. On January 3, 2022, Arnold was placed on injured reserve after suffering an ankle injury in the team's week 16 game against the San Francisco 49ers.

On August 30, 2022, Arnold was waived by the Texans and signed to the practice squad the next day. He was promoted to the active roster on October 1. He was placed on injured reserve on November 3. He was activated on December 23.

Personal life
Arnold's older sister Gabriell Mattox played college basketball at Texas.

References

External links
Philadelphia Eagles bio
Baylor Bears bio

1997 births
Living people
Players of American football from Texas
American football cornerbacks
Baylor Bears football players
Houston Texans players
People from Kountze, Texas
Philadelphia Eagles players